Yokohama Pidgin Japanese, Yokohamese or Japanese Ports Lingo was a Japanese-based pre-pidgin spoken in the Yokohama region during the late 19th century for communication between Japanese and foreigners, mainly English speaking westerners and Chinese traders. Documentation of Yokohama Pidgin Japanese shows that it was not a stable pidgin, as it often varied between individual speakers, often dependent on the first language of the speaker.

Andrei Avaram, a linguist from the University of Bucharest, referred to Yokohama Pidgin Japanese and Japanese Pidgin English as "Two sides of the same coin," due to both of them being contact languages used by traders, with little dominance between the contributing languages.

Most of the first-hand information on the pidgin comes from "Exercises in the Yokohama Dialect," a humorous booklet published in 1879 by Hoffman Atkinson.

References 

Japanese-based pidgins and creoles
Languages of Japan
Extinct languages of Asia
Languages extinct in the 19th century